Arthur Murray (1895–1991) was a dance instructor and businessman.

Arthur Murray may also refer to:

 Arthur Murray (fencer), British Olympic fencer
 Arthur Murray (footballer) (1880–1930), Scottish footballer and teacher
 Arthur Murray, 3rd Viscount Elibank (1879–1962), Liberal member of the British Parliament
 Arthur W. Murray (1918–2011), United States test pilot
 Arthur Murray (general) (1851–1925), major general in the United States Army
 USAMP Maj. Gen. Arthur Murray, a mine planter ship later renamed as the USS Trapper (ACM-9)
 The Arthur Murray Party, an American television variety show, 1950–1960